Christopher James Freeman (c. 1950 – 1992) was an Australian multi-instrumentalist and teacher who specialised in six-string and 12-string guitar for classical and flamenco music.

Life and career

Freeman was taught ukulele by his father when aged seven and learned guitar from the age of eight. He began working on multi-tracking from the age of 16.

Freeman attended Geelong Grammar School in 1966, starting at Timbertop and was in C Unit. He formed the "Dementers" a three-member guitar vocal group with Dale Hollands and Jonathan Gibson. The trio sang occasionally in the Timbertop chapel. Prince Charles attended Timbertop in this year and heard the trio. He owned a placid blue Fender electric guitar at this time and displayed a solid rhythm in performing songs like the Trogg's hit "Wild Thing". He was a capable student, joining to the higher maths classes, and possessed a sharp (sometimes wicked) sense of humour. He was popular with fellow students and teachers. Despite his asthma, he was a determined cross country runner participating in the Marathon school run and compulsory long distance weekend hiking events. In 1970 he attended Taylor's Coaching College in Melbourne and during lunch time he and friends would go to Allen's Music to play guitars and sing current Beatle songs. He liked John Lennon's songs such as "Across the Universe". He was never shy when it came to performing music. He drove a white Volkswagen "V" dub and lived in Melbourne's eastern suburbs and started performing at the Green Man coffee shop.

In 1967, when aged 17, Freeman's left hand middle fingertip was severed in a car accident. He had it replaced with a silver one crafted in a playing position. Nicknamed "Silver Finger", he learned to work around the injury using his left hand "only to press down on the strings". At the age of 21 he travelled to Spain and was taught by flamenco guitar virtuoso Manitas de Plata.

He released three solo albums, Thesilger (1976), Shifting Sands... Night & Day (1978) and Best of Chris Freeman (1991). He also issued four albums with keyboardist John Shaw, Chris Freeman and John Shaw (1981), Synthesized Orchestration (1983), Synthesized Orchestration Vol. 2 (1984) and The Best of Chris Freeman and John Shaw (1990).

In 1976 he self-financed his debut album, Thesilger, (named for the replacement finger) on T. S. F. Records. Mike Daly of The Age felt that Freeman "experimented with quaint effects involving digital harmoniser and distorted vocals – with mixed results". Two years later Freeman followed with Shifting Sands... Night & Day. When performing solo, he used a backing tape with orchestral tracks previously recorded on a Fairlight CMI.

In May 1981, Freeman combined with keyboardist and orchestral arranger John Shaw to issue an album, Chris Freeman and John Shaw, independently on Chris Freeman Records and distributed by EMI Records. Aside from his own work he also covered Gymnopedie by Satie and Recuerdos de la Alhambra by Tárrega. Daly described this album as "a very different proposition" compared to Freeman's debut: here the "melodies are dominated by [his] lyrical adaptation of the rich flamenco style". The Sydney Morning Heralds Susan Molloy found it was "of precious quality and outstanding beauty" displaying a variety of styles "from classical to flamenco to rock and roll, from disco to calypso-reggae and soft country rock".

As well as recording and performing Freeman also taught flamenco and classical guitar techniques. In early 1982 he toured with the Peter Stuyvesant International Music Festival. He issued two further albums with Shaw, Synthesized Orchestration (1983) and Synthesized Orchestration Vol. 2 (1984). In 1990 Freeman and Shaw compiled their collaborations on CD, The Best of Chris Freeman and John Shaw. The following year he released a solo compilation album, Best of Chris Freeman.

Freeman died in 1992, aged 41 or 42, after an asthma attack. Australian musicologist Ian McFarlane described him as a "[g]ifted multi-instrumentalist" who "garnered considerable praise for his work, but he never embraced the notion of mainstream acceptance".

References

General 
  Note: Archived [on-line] version has limited functionality.

Specific 

1950s births
1992 deaths
Australian classical musicians
20th-century classical musicians
20th-century Australian musicians
Flamenco guitarists
Australian guitarists
Australian male guitarists
20th-century guitarists
Year of birth uncertain
Deaths from asthma
20th-century Australian male musicians